Tendai Mukomberanwa (born 1974) is a Zimbabwean sculptor.
The son of Grace Mukomberanwa and Nicholas Mukomberanwa, Tendai worked with his father from age 10 in his early childhood days. His artwork has been sold and exhibited worldwide. He continues sculpting at the family studios in Ruwa.

Career 
Tendai began sculpting from a young age under the training of his father, world-renowned artist, Nicholas Mukomberanwa. He then received academic training by earning a Bachelor of Fine Arts from Sonoma State University in California. He then moved to South Africa where he worked as a computer teacher. He continues to sculpt at the family studio.

He is a member of the Mukomberanwa family of sculptors. Mukomberanwa is the brother of Anderson, Tendai, Taguma, Netsai, and Ennica Mukomberanwa, and the cousin of Nesbert Mukomberanwa, all of whom are sculptors.

References

External links
http://www.friendsforeverzimbabwe.com/index.php/Tendai_Mukomberanwa.html

1974 births
Living people
Sonoma State University alumni
People from Mashonaland East Province
20th-century Zimbabwean sculptors
21st-century Zimbabwean sculptors